Kowale  is a village in the administrative district of Gmina Kolbudy, within Gdańsk County, Pomeranian Voivodeship, in northern Poland. The village has a population of 4,489.

For details of the history of the region, see History of Pomerania.

Notable residents
Johannes Baasch (1905-1944), officer

Gallery

References

Villages in Gdańsk County